Colusa County is a county located in the U.S. state of California. As of the 2020 census, the population was 21,839. The county seat is Colusa. It is in the North Valley of California, northwest of the state capital, Sacramento.

History
Colusa County is one of the original counties of California, created in 1850 at the time of statehood. Parts of the county's territory were given to Tehama County in 1856 and to Glenn County in 1891.

The county was named after the 1844 Rancho Colus Mexican land grant to John Bidwell. The name of the county in the original state legislative act of 1850 was spelled Colusi, and often in newspapers was spelled Coluse. The word is derived from the name of a Patwin village known as Ko'-roo or Korusi located on the west side of the Sacramento River on the site of the present-day city of Colusa. The name was established as Colusa by 1855.

Early history 
Present-day Colusa County was originally home to the Patwin band of the Wintun people, whose territory included areas along the Sacramento River as well as lands extending west towards Lake County, bounded in the north by the sources of Stony Creek near Stonyford and in the south by Putah Creek.

Linguistically, the Patwin people in the Colusa area spoke two dialects of the Southern Wintuan language. River Patwin was spoken in villages along the Sacramento River, including at Korusi, site of the present city of Colusa. Hill Patwin was spoken in the plains and foothills to the west.

European settlement 
Present-day Colusa County was included as part of three Mexican land grants: John Bidwell's smaller 1845 Rancho Colus grant, which included the modern city of Colusa; the larger 1844 Rancho Jimeno grant, which surrounded the Colus grant; and the 1844 Larkin's Children grant, located upriver from Colusa near the present town of Princeton, California.

Geography
A large number of streams drain the county, including Elk Creek,  Salt Creek, Stony Creek and Bear Creek.

The county's eastern boundary is formed, in part, by the Sacramento River.

Adjacent counties
 Glenn County - north
 Butte County - northeast
 Sutter County - east
 Yolo County - south
 Lake County - west

National protected areas
 Butte Sink National Wildlife Refuge (part)
 Colusa National Wildlife Refuge
 Delevan National Wildlife Refuge
 Mendocino National Forest (part)
 Sacramento National Wildlife Refuge (part)

Demographics

2020 census

Note: the US Census treats Hispanic/Latino as an ethnic category. This table excludes Latinos from the racial categories and assigns them to a separate category. Hispanics/Latinos can be of any race.

2011

Places by population, race, and income

2010
The 2010 United States Census reported that Colusa County had a population of 21,419. The racial makeup of Colusa County was 13,854 (64.7%) White, 195 (0.9%) African American, 419 (2.0%) Native American, 281 (1.3%) Asian, 68 (0.3%) Pacific Islander, 5,838 (27.3%) from other races, and 764 (3.6%) from two or more races. Hispanic or Latino of any race were 11,804 persons (55.1%).

2000
As of the census of 2000, there were 18,804 people, 6,097 households, and 4,578 families residing in the county.  The population density was 16 people per square mile (6/km2).  There were 6,774 housing units at an average density of 6 per square mile (2/km2).  The racial makeup of the county was 64.3% White, 0.6% Black or African American, 2.3% Native American, 1.2% Asian, 0.4% Pacific Islander, 26.7% from other races, and 4.5% from two or more races.  46.5% of the population were Hispanic or Latino of any race. 8.5% were of German, 5.6% English, 5.5% American and 5.4% Irish ancestry according to Census 2000. 58.7% spoke English and 40.4% Spanish as their first language.

There were 6,097 households, out of which 41.4% had children under the age of 18 living with them, 59.6% were married couples living together, 9.6% had a female householder with no husband present, and 24.9% were non-families. 21.5% of all households were made up of individuals, and 10.1% had someone living alone who was 65 years of age or older.  The average household size was 3.01 and the average family size was 3.51.

In the county, the population was spread out, with 31.6% under the age of 18, 10.3% from 18 to 24, 26.9% from 25 to 44, 19.8% from 45 to 64, and 11.4% who were 65 years of age or older.  The median age was 32 years. For every 100 females there were 103.4 males.  For every 100 females age 18 and over, there were 103.8 males.

The median income for a household in the county was $35,062, and the median income for a family was $40,138. Males had a median income of $32,210 versus $21,521 for females. The per capita income for the county was $14,730.  About 13.0% of families and 16.1% of the population were below the poverty line, including 19.5% of those under age 18 and 8.2% of those age 65 or over.

Politics

Voter registration statistics

Cities by population and voter registration

Overview 
In its early history Colusa was one of the most reliable Democratic counties in California. Along with Mariposa County, it was one of only two counties in the Pacific States to support Alton B. Parker in 1904. From 1880 until 1952, Colusa only went Republican during the GOP landslides of the Roaring Twenties. Since 1952, however, Colusa has become a strongly Republican county in Presidential and congressional elections, with Lyndon Johnson, in 1964, being the last Democrat to win the county.

On November 4, 2008, Colusa County voted 71.6% for Proposition 8 which amended the California Constitution to ban same-sex marriages.

Crime 

The following table includes the number of incidents reported and the rate per 1,000 persons for each type of offense.

Cities by population and crime rates

Transportation

Major highways
 Interstate 5
 State Route 16
 State Route 20
 State Route 45

Public transportation
Colusa County Transit runs buses from Colusa to Williams, Arbuckle, Grimes and College City, with limited service to Maxwell.

Airports
Colusa County Airport is a general-aviation airport located near the city of Colusa.

Communities

Cities
Colusa (county seat)
Williams

Census-designated places
Arbuckle
College City
Grimes
Lodoga
Maxwell
Princeton
Stonyford

Unincorporated community
Sites

Population ranking

The population ranking of the following table is based on the 2010 census of Colusa County.

† county seat

California Historical Landmarks
California Historical Landmarks in Colusa County:

 Colusa County Courthouse built in  1861,.
 Letts Valley settled in 1855 by Jack and David Lett. Marker at Letts Lake Campground at Letts Lake.
 Swift's Stone Corral, built by Granville P. Swift in 1850.

See also 
 List of school districts in Colusa County, California
 National Register of Historic Places listings in Colusa County, California
 Thomas D. Harp, mentions 1891 division of the county

Notes

References

External links

Colusa County Sun Herald
Colusa County Guide

 
California counties
Sacramento Valley
1850 establishments in California
Populated places established in 1850
Majority-minority counties in California
California placenames of Native American origin